Michel Brusselmans (Paris, 12 Februari 1886 – Brussels, 20 September 1960) was a Belgian composer.

Biography
Michel Brusselmans was born in a Belgian family that had settled in Paris and was the younger brother of the painter Jean Brusselmans. He studied at the Royal Conservatory of Brussels with Gustave Huberti and Edgar Tinel, and completed his studies with Vincent d’Indy and Paul Gilson. In 1911 Brusselmans won the Prix de Rome. He wished to have a career as a violinist and a conductor, but had to give up this dream because of an eye defect.

In 1921, Brusselmans moved to Paris where he worked for Édouard Salabert, a music publisher who agreed to publish Brusselmans’ compositions in exchange for doing household chores. Later on, Brusselmans also composed music for silent films for Salabert, of which his best known piece was written for The Mummy in 1932.

During the Second World War the composer was forced to return to Brussels, where he had to work for Sender Brüssel, the broadcast of the German occupier. After the war, he returned to France and later moved to Spain, where he settled in Alicante.

Michel Brusselmans composed orchestral music, chamber music, songs, choir music, theater scores, radio works and movie scores. His oeuvre is impressionistic; the majority consists of program music.

Sources
 Biography of Michel Brusselmans at SVM
 List of works of Michel Brusselmans at CeBeDeM

1886 births
1960 deaths
20th-century classical composers
20th-century Belgian male musicians
Belgian classical composers
Belgian male classical composers
Prix de Rome (Belgium) winners
Royal Conservatory of Brussels alumni